Proceratophrys salvatori is a species of frog in the family Odontophrynidae. It is endemic to Brazil and known from eastern Goiás and the Federal District. Its natural habitat is Cerrado savanna, where it occurs on the ground near waterbodies. The tadpoles develop in small temporary streams. It is threatened by habitat loss caused by agricultural development and fires.

References

salvatori
Amphibians of Brazil
Endemic fauna of Brazil
Taxa named by Ulisses Caramaschi
Amphibians described in 1996
Taxonomy articles created by Polbot